Gwyn Griffin (1922–1967) was an English novelist.

Life
Gwyn Griffin was born in Egypt, where his father was in the Colonial Service, and was educated in England. During World War II he performed administrative duties in several British colonies in Africa. These included service as a cipher clerk to Major Orde Wingate in Ethiopia and later as adjutant to Prince Makonnen, one of the sons of Emperor Haile Selassie I, in the Sudan Defence Force. In 1946-47 he was an Assistant Superintendent in the Eritrean Police, and later worked as a port pilot in Assab. Imperfect eyesight prevented him from becoming an officer in the British Merchant Navy. In 1950 he married Patricia Dorman-Smith, a daughter of Sir Reginald Dorman-Smith. The couple lived in Australia and the Canary Islands before settling in Introdacqua in the Abruzzo region of Italy. They had no children. Gwyn Griffin died of a bloodstream infection in October 1967, while being treated for a spinal disk problem.

Work
Although most of Griffin's books are set in former British colonies, Master of this Vessel and An Operational Necessity are sea stories and A Last Lamp Burning is set in Naples. Gwyn Griffin's books were well received by the public, and his storytelling ability was particularly noted in reviews of his work. In 1965 he was awarded a Putnam Award for A Last Lamp Burning.

His final novel, An Operational Necessity, was based on the Peleus Incident, the only documented case in World War II in which a U-boat machine-gunned survivors in the water. It was a Book of the Month Club selection and at the time of his death was on The New York Times Best Seller list. It was reissued in 1999 by the Harvill Press.

Books by Gwyn Griffin 
The Occupying Power – 1956
By the North Gate – 1958
Something of an Achievement – 1960
Master of This Vessel (published in England as Shipmaster) – 1961
A Significant Experience – 1963
Freedom Observed – 1963
Sons of God – 1964
A Scorpion on a Stone – 1965
A Last Lamp Burning – 1966
An Operational Necessity – 1967

References

1922 births
1967 deaths
20th-century English novelists
English male novelists
20th-century English male writers
British expatriates in Egypt